"WorkOut" is the second single from RuPaul's album Red Hot. The song is a dance/house song about feeling liberated while dancing. The expression "work out" is (not exclusively) gay slang for expressing one's self exuberantly; it is similar to RuPaul's coined phrase "You better work!". Two versions of the single were made available; one version, with 8 tracks, was released by RuPaul on her own RuCo, Inc. label. The other version, a 3 track version released only in Germany, was released on the Dance Street label.

Music video
The music video was catered to club play and features a montage of RuPaul in different outfits singing the song in locations such as a roof top and a dance club.

Track listings
WorkOut (The RuMixes) (Ruco, Inc. Single)
 WorkOut (Blueroom Radio) – 3:30
 WorkOut (Junior's Spirit Club) – 7:51
 WorkOut (Eric Kupper Dub) – 7:52
 WorkOut (Blueroom Mix Show) – 7:22
 WorkOut (Junior's NYC Radio) – 3:39
 WorkOut (Joe Carrano's Ragged Radio) – 3:31
 WorkOut (Junior's Club Dub) – 6:55
 Looking Good, Feeling Gorgeous (D1 Music ReDux) – 4:39

German Single
 WorkOut (Joe Carrano's Ragged Radio)
 WorkOut (Junior's Spirit Club)
 Looking Good, Feeling Gorgeous (Looking Good Feeling Gomi Mix)

Credits and personnel 
RuPaul – lead vocals, producer
Omri Anghel – producer
Robert Brown – songwriter
Sharlotte Gibson – background vocals
Frankie Knuckles – songwriter
Eric Kupper – songwriter
John Madden Jr. – songwriter
Darrell Martin – producer, background vocals
Tom Trujillo – background vocals
Source:

Chart performance

References

2004 singles
RuPaul songs
Songs written by Eric Kupper
2004 songs
LGBT-related songs
Hip house songs